Central African Republic–Congo border may refer to:

Central African Republic–Democratic Republic of the Congo border
Central African Republic–Republic of the Congo border.